Jørgen Leonard Firing (9 March 1894 – 7 March 1977) was a Norwegian politician for the Conservative Party.

He was born in Horten.

He was elected to the Norwegian Parliament from the Market towns of Vestfold county in 1945, but was not re-elected in 1949. On the local level, Firing was a member of Horten city council from 1925 to 1931 and 1947 to 1963.

Outside politics he worked as an engineer. He was a member of the board of the local newspaper from 1945 to 1965 and the local savings bank from 1951 to 1965.

He fought for the British Empire in the First World War. For this he received the British War Medal and the Allied Victory Medal.

References

1894 births
1977 deaths
Conservative Party (Norway) politicians
Members of the Storting
Vestfold politicians
People from Horten
British military personnel of World War I
20th-century Norwegian politicians